Silbergeld is a surname. Notable people with the surname include:
 Ellen Silbergeld (born 1945), environmental health expert and MacArthur Fellow
 Jerome Silbergeld (born 1944), scholar of Chinese art